This is a list of Aiphanes species. Aiphanes is a genus of spiny palms which is native to tropical regions of South America,  Central America, and the Caribbean.

Species
Names in green are currently accepted species, while those in red are not.

Notes

References

Aiphanes
Aiphanes